Elizabeth Campbell, Duchess of Argyll, 1st Baroness Hamilton of Hameldon ( December 1733 – 20 December 1790), earlier Elizabeth Hamilton, Duchess of Hamilton,  Gunning, was a celebrated Anglo-Irish beauty, lady-in-waiting to Queen Charlotte, and society hostess.

Early life 
Born in Hemingford Grey, Huntingdonshire, Elizabeth Gunning was one of the daughters of John Gunning of Castle Coote, County Roscommon, and his wife, Bridget Bourke, a daughter of Theobald Bourke, 3rd Viscount Mayo (1681–1741). Elizabeth's elder sister was Maria Gunning, later Countess of Coventry.

In late 1740 or early 1741, the Gunning family returned from England to John Gunning's ancestral home in Ireland, where they divided their time between their country house in Roscommon and a rented town house in Dublin. According to some sources, when Maria and her sister Elizabeth came of age, their mother urged them to take up acting, in order to earn a living, owing to the family's relative poverty, even though acting was not considered a respectable profession, as many actresses of that time doubled as courtesans; and that the Gunning sisters worked for some time in the Dublin theatres, befriending actors who included Margaret Woffington. However, Woffington did not arrive in Dublin until May 1751, by which time Maria and her sister Elizabeth were in England.

In October 1748, a ball was held at Dublin Castle by the Viscountess Petersham. The two sisters did not have any dresses for the gathering until Thomas Sheridan, manager of one of the local theatres, supplied them with two costumes from the green room, those of Lady Macbeth and Juliet. Wearing the costumes, they were presented to the Earl of Harrington, the then Lord Lieutenant of Ireland. Harrington must have been pleased by the meeting as, by 1750, Bridget Gunning had persuaded him to grant her a pension, which she then used to transport herself, Maria, and Elizabeth, back to their original home in Huntingdon, England. With their attendance at local balls and parties, the beauty of the two girls was much remarked upon. They became well-known celebrities, their fame reaching all the way to London, with themselves following soon afterwards. On 2 December 1750, they were presented at the Court of St James's. By this time, they were sufficiently famous that the presentation was noted in the London newspapers.

Elizabeth was immortalized in portraits by, among others, artists Joshua Reynolds and Gavin Hamilton.

Marriages

In January or February 1752, Elizabeth met the young James Hamilton, 6th Duke of Hamilton (1724–1758). According to Horace Walpole, it was on 14 February (Valentine's Day) at a party at Bedford House, and the duke declared his wish to marry Elizabeth that night and called for a local clergyman to perform the ceremony. However, without a licence, calling of banns, or a ring, the clergyman  refused. They were eventually married that night in May Fair Chapel, which did not require a licence, with a ring from a bed-curtain, whereupon Elizabeth became the Duchess of Hamilton.

Walpole said of the couple: "Duke Hamilton is the abstract of Scotch pride: he and the Duchess at their own house walk in to dinner before their company, sit together at the upper end of their own table, eat off the same plate, and drink to nobody beneath the rank of Earl—would not one wonder how they could get any body either above or below that rank to dine with them at all?".

Soon after the duke died on 17 January 1758, aged only 33, Elizabeth became engaged to Francis Egerton, 3rd Duke of Bridgewater, but the engagement was cancelled that year for reasons unknown. On 3 February the following year she married John Campbell, Marquess of Lorne, son and heir of the Duke of Argyll.

From 1761 to 1784, she was a Lady of the Bedchamber to Queen Charlotte. Her husband succeeded to his father's title of Duke of Argyll in 1770, and Elizabeth became known as the Duchess of Argyll. On 20 May 1776, King George III, a long time admirer of hers, created her Baroness Hamilton of Hameldon in her own right.

Children
Elizabeth had three children from her first marriage to the Duke of Hamilton:
Lady Elizabeth Hamilton (26 January 1753 – 14 March 1797), married Edward Smith-Stanley, 12th Earl of Derby
James Hamilton, 7th Duke of Hamilton (18 February 1755 – 7 July 1769)
Douglas Hamilton, 8th Duke of Hamilton (24 July 1756 – 2 August 1799)

Elizabeth had five children from her second marriage, with the Duke of Argyll:
Lady Augusta Campbell
George John Campbell, Earl of Campbell (1763–1764)
George Campbell, 6th Duke of Argyll (1768–1839)
Lady Charlotte Campbell (1775–1861), married firstly Colonel John Campbell and secondly Rev. Edward John Bury
John Campbell, 7th Duke of Argyll (1777–1847)

Later life
Elizabeth died on 20 December 1790 at her home of Argyll House in London and was buried at  Kilmun Parish Church in Kilmun, Argyllshire.

Honours
 Lady of the Bedchamber, 1761–1784

As Baroness Hamilton of Hameldon, Elizabeth received a grant of arms, blazoned:  Gules, on a fess ermine, between three doves argent ducally crowned or, as many crosses pattée, of the first, which incorporate elements of the arms of her own Gunning family.

References

The Two Beautiful Misses Gunning
The Gunning Sisters
Undone by Virginia Henley
Horace Bleackley, The Story of a Beautiful Duchess: being an account of the life & times of Elizabeth Gunning, Duchess of Hamilton & Argyll (New York, E. P. Dutton and Co., 1907)

External links

 

1733 births
1790 deaths
British duchesses by marriage
Elizabeth
Barons in the Peerage of Great Britain
Hereditary peeresses of Great Britain created by George III
People from Hemingford Grey
Ladies of the Bedchamber
18th-century Irish people
E
Court of George III of the United Kingdom
Wives of knights